"Justice" is the second solo single by Scottish musician Paul Haig, released in October 1983 in the UK by Island Records. The song was recorded in New York City and produced by Alex Sadkin.

Track listing
 "Justice"
 "On This Night of Decision"
 "Justice 82"

References

External links
 

1983 singles
Paul Haig songs
1983 songs
Songs written by Paul Haig
Island Records singles
Song recordings produced by Alex Sadkin